Wexford O'Hanrahan railway station is a railway station located in Wexford Town in County Wexford, Ireland.

Description
The station is part of the Dublin–Rosslare railway line. It is staffed and fully accessible.

It consists of a single platform and passing loop.

It had sidings, used in recent years by occasional permanent way trains. With the coming of the mini-CTC signalling system in April 2008, a passing loop was installed at the Dublin end of the station.

Onward bus services
Thirteen Bus Éireann local bus routes serve the station:  11 routes terminate, and rail replacement route 370 to/from Wellingtonbridge and Campile and route 132 to Dublin via Carnew, Baltinglass and Tallaght call. Routes 370 and 385 (to Rosslare Strand) operate Mondays to Saturdays: the other routes operate on one or two days of the week, provide links to rural hamlets and villages such as Broadway, Crossabeg, Curracloe, Fethard-on-Sea, Kilmuckridge and Tacumshane. The bus stop is at the front of the station.

Wexford Bus provides four local bus routes, all operating Monday to Saturday inclusive. They link to Castlebridge, Kilmore Quay via Bridgetown and Rosslare Strand. There is also a route serving different areas in the town. The stops are on Redmond Square.

History
The station opened on 17 August 1874. It was given the name O'Hanrahan on 10 April 1966 in commemoration of Michael O'Hanrahan, one of the executed leaders of the 1916 Easter Rising.

See also
 List of railway stations in Ireland

References

External links

Irish Rail webpage of Wexford station

Iarnród Éireann stations in County Wexford
Railway stations in County Wexford
Railway stations opened in 1874
Wexford, County Wexford